Cage Warriors (CW) is an Irish owned mixed martial arts promotion, based in London, England. The promotion was established in 2001 and staged its first MMA event in London in July, 2002.

Many MMA stars have made their names under the Cage Warriors banner, including Conor McGregor, Michael Bisping, Paddy Pimblett, Gegard Mousasi, Antônio Silva, Jeff Monson, Martin Kampmann, Dan Hardy, Joe Duffy, Cathal Pendred, Neil Seery, and Dennis Siver. CW are one of the few top promotions to take their events abroad, travelling throughout countries in Europe, North America and the Middle East.

The promotion is watched globally via a host of television partners such as BT Sport, FreeSports and Viasat, and is one of the featured promotions on the Ultimate Fighting Championship (UFC)'s digital streaming service, UFC Fight Pass. It is currently being presented by UFC & BT Sport analyst Dan Hardy, with commentators Josh Palmer and Brad Wharton.

History
Cage Warriors Fighting Championship (CWFC) was founded by Dougie Truman in 2001; the first event, titled 'Armageddon', took place on July 27, 2002, and saw notable fighters such as Jean Silva, Rosi Sexton, Matt Ewin and Paul Jenkins claim victories.

Irishman Graham Boylan assumed control of Cage Warriors in 2010 and expanded the promotion's reach to mainland Europe and Asia, staging shows in England, Ireland, Russia, Ukraine, Jordan, United Arab Emirates, Lebanon and Bahrain. The Cage Warriors head office is located in London.

Following Cage Warriors 74 in November 2014 the promotion went into hiatus, with Boylan announcing his resignation as CEO in February 2015.

However, in June 2015, Boylan announced on The MMA Hour he had acquired the promotion and would be bringing it back to prominence again.

The promotion has since secured a digital broadcasting deal with the UFC to have its shows shown live across the world on UFC Fight Pass, and has also brokered television broadcast deals with major broadcasters across Europe and Asia.

Cage Warriors 114 marked the first time a mixed martial arts event in the United Kingdom was officially approved by the government.

Broadcast deals
Cage Warriors Events is watched globally via a host of television partners such as BT Sport, FreeSports and Viasat, and is one of the few featured promotions on UFC’s digital streaming service UFC Fight Pass.

Rules

Cage Warriors bouts are conducted in conjunction with local athletic commissions, using the Unified Rules of Mixed Martial Arts.

Cage Warriors bouts are officiated by top European officials, including British referees Marc Goddard and Rich Mitchell, and judged by world-experienced officials including Ben Cartlidge, David Lethaby and Mark Collett.

Events

Scheduled events

Past events

Current champions

Cage Warriors title history

Cage Warriors Super Heavyweight Championship (defunct)
Weight limit: Unlimited

Cage Warriors Heavyweight Championship
Weight limit:

Cage Warriors Light Heavyweight Championship
Weight limit:

Cage Warriors Middleweight Championship
Weight limit:

Cage Warriors Welterweight Championship
Weight limit:

Cage Warriors Lightweight Championship
Weight limit:

Cage Warriors Featherweight Championship
Weight limit:

Cage Warriors Bantamweight Championship
Weight limit:

Cage Warriors Flyweight Championship
Weight limit:

Cage Warriors Women's Bantamweight Championship
Weight limit:

Cage Warriors Women's Flyweight Championship
Weight limit:

Records

Most wins in title bouts
The following includes all fighters with three or more championship and/or interim championship title wins. Fighters with the same number of title wins are arranged in order of less title bouts losses.

Most consecutive title defenses
The following includes all Cage Warriors champions who were able to consecutively defend their title two times or more. Fighters with the same number of title defenses are listed chronologically.

Multi-division champions

Simultaneous two division champions

References

Notes

External links
Official Cage Warriors website
Official Cage Warriors live streaming website
Cage Warriors event results on Sherdog
Cage Warriors 2011 promo
Official YouTube channel

Mixed martial arts organizations
Sports organizations established in 2001
Recurring events established in 2002
2001 establishments in England
Mixed martial arts events lists